Always Will Be may refer to:

Music
 Always Will Be (EP), a 2003 EP by J-Live
 "Always Will Be" (HammerFall song), 2000

Other uses
 "Always Was, Always Will Be [Aboriginal Land]", often abbreviated to "Always Will be", a rallying cry for protest in the Australian Aboriginal rights movement
 Always Will Be (exhibition), a 2017 exhibition of photographs by Aboriginal Australian photojournalist Barbara McGrady

See also
Always Was, Is and Always Shall Be, 1980 album by GG Allin
 It Always Will Be, 2004 album by Willie Nelson